Public Storage is an American international self storage company headquartered in Glendale, California, that is run as a real estate investment trust (REIT). It is the largest brand of self-storage services in the US. In 2008, it was the largest of four publicly traded storage REITs. There are more than 2,200 Public Storage self-storage locations in the US, Canada and Europe. It also owns 42 percent of an office parks subsidiary, sells packing supplies, and provides other services. As a REIT, it is owned by real estate investors, who receive more than 90 percent of the company's profits as a return-on-investment.

Public Storage Inc. was founded in 1972 by B. Wayne Hughes and Kenneth Volk Jr. It grew to 1,000 locations by 1989, using funding from investors in real estate limited partnerships (RELPs). The private company was re-structured as a publicly traded REIT in 1995, when Storage Equities merged with Public Storage and adopted its name. In 2006 it acquired Shurgard Storage Centers in a $5.5 billion transaction. Shurgard has since been spun-out in to a separate publicly traded entity, with Public Storage retaining 36.6% of the company.

History

Origins
The idea for Public Storage was conceived by Southern California real estate developer B. Wayne Hughes in the early 1970s. During a trip to Texas, he observed that local real estate developers were doing well creating mini-storage facilities outside of Dallas and Houston. He brought the self-storage concept back with him to California. Hughes partnered with Kenneth Volk and the two founded Public Storage in August 1972 with a $50,000 initial investment, at first calling it "Private Storage Spaces Inc."

The first warehouse was built in 1972 in El Cajon, California. According to Hughes, "Private Storage Spaces Inc." confused people into thinking it was private, so the name was changed to "Public Storage" to match the PS acronym. The founders initially planned to build the storage warehouses as a temporary source of income until the land became more valuable and could be redeveloped for another use.

Within three months, the first location was breaking even with a 35 percent occupancy. The units were rented for a similar price per square foot as apartments or office space,  but cost 35 to 50 percent less to build and maintain. A property management subsidiary called Public Storage Management Inc. was formed in 1973. By 1974, 20 locations had been built.

Real Estate Limited Partnership financing

Hughes disliked loans, so he financed the purchase and development of new properties primarily through real estate limited partnerships (RELPs). At first, Public Storage built warehouses and sold them to independent RELPs for a development fee. The company's own RELP, called Public Storage Partners Ltd, was formed in 1975 and closed its first deal for $3 million in investments two years later. Public Storage paid cash to acquire property and build a self-storage facility, then used the property's income to pay investors back and earn a portion as profit. Public Storage Inc. also earned revenues from a portion of each deal that was made.

Early investors earned three to four times their money back due to increasing property values in Southern California, high occupancy rates, and increasing storage rental prices. By the mid-1980s, Public Storage was raising $200 to $300 million in investments each year. The RELP format allowed the firm to continue building more locations in the 1970s and 1980s when most of the industry had halted growth because of higher interest rates on loans. In the mid-1980s, co-founder Volk retired and his interest in Public Storage was purchased by Hughes. Forbes estimated that by this time the company was worth $800 million.

Investment funding was used to build mini-storage warehouses beyond California, targeting the 39 largest US cities. The firm opened self-storage locations in close proximity to each other, so the  sites could share a development office, and  justify local television advertising. The firm's growth slowed in the mid-1980s as new competition increased the cost of property and slowed the increase in rental prices to consumers. Poor weather and difficult labor markets outside of California delayed development projects; the company also made poor investments in office parks. Interest in real estate investing also diminished.

By the late 1980s, the company opened its 1,000th Public Storage location and the company was three times larger than its nearest competitor in the US market. By 1989, $2.7 billion had been invested from 200,000 investors. Public Storage helped popularize the use of self-storage businesses as a real estate investment vehicle and became one of the longest-running RELP investment vehicles. By 1991, Public Storage had set up more than 150 RELPs and real estate investment trusts (REITs).

Real Estate Investment Trust (REIT)
According to Financial World, by 1989 the real estate limited partnership (RELP) market that Public Storage relied on for funding "all but vanished". A book by Public Storage Inc. said the Tax Reform Act of 1986 reduced the tax benefits of RELPs and was followed by "a tough time for real estate companies." In December 1990, five of its partnerships were converted to Real Estate Investment Trusts (REITs) in December. It also began consolidating its partnerships and acquiring many of the companies in which it held an interest.

Storage Equities was founded by Public Storage in 1980 to purchase self-storage facilities. It was one of 17 self-storage REITs that Public Storage held an interest in. Between 1992 and 1995, Storage Equities paid Public Storage $31 million in management and consulting fees. In 1995, Public Storage and its subsidiaries were merged with its self-storage REIT, Storage Equities Inc., and re-structured as a single REIT called Public Storage Inc. One analyst said the acquisition capitalized on conflict of interest concerns, while Hughes said the merger was set up to alleviate them.

In 1995, the company spun-off its box, locks, and packing and moving supplies business into the PS Orangeco subsidiary; Public Storage said this was done to avoid the risk of losing the company's tax-free REIT status if too large a portion of the company's business is no longer related to real estate. This frustrated institutional investors that can only invest in real estate companies and could no longer invest in the new non-real estate subsidiaries. By 1998, Public Storage had $141 million in quarterly revenues, $2 billion in assets and 1,200 facilities in 38 states. Later that year, Public Storage acquired a competing storage company called Storage Trust Realty in a $600 million transaction.

Recent history
Public Storage grew steadily in the early 2000s and was added to the S&P 500 in 2005. In 2006 it acquired Shurgard Storage Centers in a transaction totaling $5.5 billion, acquiring 624 locations, including 141 in Europe. Public Storage had attempted to acquire the company in 2000 and again in 2005, but its offers were rejected. The company has continued to make numerous acquisitions, such as a March 2010 purchase of 30 locations from A-American Self Storage.

Operations

Public Storage is the largest self-storage brand in the US. As of 2022, there were 2,836 Public Storage locations in the United States.  There are 193 locations in Europe; European locations are operated by Shurgard Europe, which Public Storage owns 49 percent of. There are also 2,546 office parks operated by PS Business Parks, which Public Storage owns a 42 percent interest in. The largest self-storage business in Canada is operated by a separate company that is allowed to use the Public Storage brand.

Self-storage locations tend to be in dense clusters in major cities, especially near freeways and intersections. Public Storage has very few employees for a company of its size. Customer access to each storage location is automated. Some locations have on-site property managers residing who are paid close to minimum wage to monitor the facility, without having to pay utilities or rent.

Failure to pay rental fees 
The contents of a storage unit are put up for auction if the rental fees are not paid for sixty days. Although the TV show Storage Wars created increased interest in the auctions, most units do not contain anything of substantial economic value. Sometimes auctioning the renter's property can result in disputes between Public Storage and the renter. In 2007, a customer's belongings were auctioned for non-payment while he was serving the US military in Iraq. After receiving negative publicity, Public Storage apologized and gave him $8,000 as compensation for his sold belongings.

Theft, insurance and damages 
In 2005, Public Storage said in a public filing that there had been "an increasing number of claims and litigation against owners and managers of rental properties relating to moisture infiltration, which can result in mold or other property damage." The company's rental contract says it is not responsible for the storage unit's contents, even if damage is caused by defects in the unit, and The Wall Street Journal reported that there were "surprisingly few remedies" for theft or property damage at self-storage facilities.

Many Public Storage customers have filed complaints with the Better Business Bureau regarding insurance policies sold by Public Storage representatives, after experiencing burglaries of their storage units then having their insurance claims denied. Investigative journalists from TV news stations in California, Kansas, and Washington have reported on difficulties consumers had when filing insurance claims for burglaries with Willis and The New Hampshire Insurance Company, which are affiliated with Public Storage. For example, claims have been denied because the storage unit had an intact lock; affiliated insurance companies cited insufficient evidence of forced entry, though burglars often replace the unit's lock in an attempt to conceal the burglary. Insurance commissioners in two states have criticized the practices of insurance companies affiliated with Public Storage. An ongoing class action lawsuit alleges Public Storage misleads consumers into thinking that insurance premiums are charged at cost, whereas a substantial amount of those premiums are retained as profits by Public Storage. Sales of these insurance policies do have a high profit, but generate less than five percent of the company's total revenue.

Financials
Public Storage is a "self-administered, self-managed" real estate investment trust (REIT). A REIT is an organization that primarily purchases and operates real estate investments and returns at least 90 percent of its incomes to investors. It combines the capital of a large number of investors for real estate projects. As of 2008, Public Storage was the largest of four publicly traded self-storage REITs. As of 2013, it had a profit margin of 50 percent, the third-highest in the S&P 500. Public Storage has risen 17% annually, including dividends over the past 20 years (as of Q1 2016). This is a growth rate which is double the S&P 500.

More than 90 percent of Public Storage's revenues are from its self-storage operations; it also provides insurance, packing products, and has a 44 percent interest in PS Business Parks. In 1984, PS Reinsurance was formed to sell insurance for a storage unit's contents. In 1995, PS Orangeco was created as a subsidiary, selling boxes, packaging, truck rentals, and other moving supplies.

Ronald L. Havner, Jr., then-CEO of Public Storage, earned $10.5 million in 2017.

References

External links

Financial services companies established in 1972
Companies listed on the New York Stock Exchange
Real estate investment trusts of the United States
Companies based in Glendale, California
Financial services companies of the United States
Storage companies
1972 establishments in California
Real estate companies established in 1972
American companies established in 1972